Elena Sergeyevna Vaytsekhovskaya (born 1 March 1958) is a former Soviet diver and Olympic champion. She competed at the 1976 Olympic Games in Montreal, where she received a gold medal in 10 m platform.  She won Bronze and Silver Medals for 10m diving at the European Championships in 1974 and 1977 respectively.

Since 1991, she has worked as a sports journalist for Sport-Express, and is considered one of the best sports journalists in Russia.

See also
 List of members of the International Swimming Hall of Fame

References

External links
 Vaytsekhovskaya's articles translations

1958 births
Living people
Soviet female divers
Russian female divers
Olympic divers of the Soviet Union
Divers at the 1976 Summer Olympics
Olympic gold medalists for the Soviet Union
Olympic medalists in diving
Medalists at the 1976 Summer Olympics
Soviet sports journalists
Russian sports journalists
Honoured Masters of Sport of the USSR
Universiade medalists in diving
Universiade silver medalists for the Soviet Union
Russian State University of Physical Education, Sport, Youth and Tourism alumni
Medalists at the 1977 Summer Universiade